An endonym (also known as autonym) is a common, native name for a geographical place, group of people, individual person, language or dialect, meaning that it is used inside that particular place, group, or linguistic community in question; it is their self-identification and self-designated name for themselves, their homeland, or their language.

An exonym (also known as xenonym) is an established, non-native name for a geographical place, group of people, individual person, language or dialect, meaning that it is used only outside that particular place, group, or linguistic community. Exonyms exist not only for historico-geographical reasons but also in consideration of difficulties when pronouncing foreign words, or from non-systematic attempts at transcribing into a different writing system.

Naming and etymology 
The terms autonym, endonym, exonym and xenonym are formed by adding specific prefixes to the Greek root word  ('name'), from Proto-Indo-European .

The prefixes added to these terms are also derived from Greek:

endonym:  ('within');
exonym:  ('outside');
autonym:  ('self'); and
xenonym:  ('foreign').

The terms autonym and xenonym also have different applications, thus leaving endonym and exonym as the preferred forms.

Marcel Aurousseau, an Australian geographer, first used the term exonym in his work The Rendering of Geographical Names (1957). The term endonym was subsequently devised as a retronymic antonym for the term exonym.

Typology 
Endonyms and exonyms can be divided in three main categories:

 endonyms and exonyms of place names (toponyms),
 endonyms and exonyms of human names (anthroponyms), including names of ethnic groups (ethnonyms), localised populations (demonyms), and individuals (personal names),
 endonyms and exonyms of language names (glossonyms).

Endonyms and exonyms of toponyms 
As it pertains to geographical features, the United Nations Group of Experts on Geographical Names defines:

Endonym: "Name of a geographical feature in an official or well-established language occurring in that area where the feature is located."
 Exonym: "Name used in a specific language for a geographical feature situated outside the area where that language is spoken, and differing in its form from the name used in an official or well-established language of that area where the geographical feature is located."

Endonyms and exonyms of glossonyms 

Exonyms in relation to endonyms 
By their relation to endonyms, all exonyms can be divided into three main categories:

 those that are cognate words, diverged only in pronunciation or orthography;
 those that are fully or partially translated (a calque) from the native language.

Sometimes, a place name may be unable to use many of the letters when transliterated into an exonym because of the corresponding language's lack of common sounds. Māori, having only one liquid consonant, is an example of this here.

Cognate exonyms 
London (originally ), for example, is known by the cognate exonyms:

  in Catalan, Filipino, French, Galician, Portuguese, and Spanish;
  in Greek;
  in Dutch;
  in Italian, Maltese, Romanian, Sardinian and Turkish;
  in Albanian;
  in Czech and Slovak;
  in Polish;
  in Māori;
  in Icelandic;
  in Irish;
  in Scottish Gaelic;
  in Welsh;
  in Finnish;
  in Persian;
  in Armenian;
 Luân Đôn in Vietnamese.

Translated exonyms 
An example of a translated exonym is the name for the Netherlands ( in Dutch) used, respectively, in German, French, Italian, Spanish, Irish, Portuguese and Romanian, all of which mean "Low Countries". However, note that the endonym  is singular, while all the aforementioned translations are plural.

Native and borrowed exonyms 
Exonyms can also be divided into native and borrowed, e.g., from a third language.

A substantial proportion of English-language exonyms for places in continental Europe are borrowed (or adapted) from French; for example:

 Belgrade;
 Bucharest;
 Cologne;
 Florence;
 Milan;
 Munich;
 Naples ( / );
 Navarre ( / );
 Prague; and
 Rome.

Typical development of exonyms 
According to James Matisoff, who introduced the term autonym into linguistics: "Human nature being what it is, exonyms are liable to be pejorative rather than complimentary, especially where there is a real or fancied difference in cultural level between the ingroup and the outgroup." For example, Matisoff notes,  "an opprobrious term indicating mixed race or parentage" is the Palaung name for Jingpo people and the Jingpo name for Chin people; both the Jingpo and Burmese use the Chinese word  as the name for Lisu people.

Exonyms develop for places of significance for speakers of the language of the exonym. Consequently, many European capitals have English exonyms, for example:

 Athens;
 Belgrade;
 Bucharest;
 Brussels;
 Copenhagen;
 Lisbon;
 Moscow;
 Prague;
 Rome;
 Vienna; and
 Warsaw.

In contrast, historically less-prominent capitals such as Ljubljana and Zagreb do not have English exonyms, but do have exonyms in languages spoken nearby, e.g. Madrid, Berlin, Oslo, and Amsterdam, with identical names in most major European languages, are exceptions.

Some European cities might be considered partial exceptions, in that whilst the spelling is the same across languages, the pronunciation can differ. For example, the city of Paris is spelled the same way in French and English, but the French pronunciation [] is different from the English pronunciation [].

For places considered to be of lesser significance, attempts to reproduce local names have been made in English since the time of the Crusades. Livorno, for instance, was Leghorn because it was an Italian port essential to English merchants and, by the 18th century, to the British Navy; not far away, Rapallo, a minor port on the same sea, never received an exonym.

In earlier times, the name of the first tribe or village encountered became the exonym for the whole people beyond.

The Germanic invaders of the Roman Empire applied the word "Walha" to foreigners they encountered and this evolved in West Germanic languages as a generic name for all non-Germanic speakers; thence:
 Wallachia, the historic name of Romania inhabited by the Vlachs
 the slavic term Vlah for “Romanian”, dialectally “Italian, Latin”
 Wallonia, the french-speaking region of Belgium
 Cornwall and Wales, the Celtic-speaking regions located West of the Anglo-Saxon-dominated England
 Wallis, a mostly french-speaking canton in Switzerland
 Welschland, the German name for the french-speaking Switzerland
 the Polish and Hungarian names for Italy,  and  respectively

Usage

In avoiding exonyms 

During the late 20th century, the use of exonyms often became controversial. Groups often prefer that outsiders avoid exonyms where they have come to be used in a pejorative way. For example, Romani people often prefer that term to exonyms such as Gypsy (from the name of Egypt), and the French term  (from the name of Bohemia). People may also avoid exonyms for reasons of historical sensitivity, as in the case of German names for Polish and Czech places that, at one time, had been ethnically or politically German (e.g. Danzig/Gdańsk, Auschwitz/Oświęcim and Karlsbad/Karlovy Vary); and Russian names for non-Russian locations that were subsequently renamed or had their spelling changed (e.g. Kiev/Kyiv).

In recent years, geographers have sought to reduce the use of exonyms to avoid this kind of problem. For example, it is now common for Spanish speakers to refer to the Turkish capital as Ankara rather than use the Spanish exonym . According to the United Nations Statistics Division:

Time has, however, shown that initial ambitious attempts to rapidly decrease the number of exonyms were over-optimistic and not possible to realise in an intended way. The reason would appear to be that many exonyms have become common words in a language and can be seen as part of the language's cultural heritage.

In preference of exonyms 

In some situations, the use of exonyms can be preferred. For instance, in multilingual cities such as Brussels, which is known for its linguistic tensions between Dutch- and French-speakers, a neutral name may be preferred so as to not offend anyone. Thus, an exonym such as Brussels in English could be used instead of favoring either one of the local names.

Other difficulties with endonyms have to do with pronunciation, spelling, and word category. The endonym may include sounds and spellings that are highly unfamiliar to speakers of other languages, making appropriate usage difficult if not impossible for an outsider. Over the years, the endonym may have undergone phonetic changes, either in the original language or the borrowing language, thus changing an endonym into an exonym, as in the case of Paris, where the s was formerly pronounced in French. Another example is the endonym for the German city of Cologne, where the Latin original of  has evolved into  in German, while the Italian and Spanish exonym  or the Portuguese  closely reflects the Latin original.

In some cases, no standardised spelling is available, either because the language itself is unwritten (even unanalysed) or because there are competing non-standard spellings. Use of a misspelled endonym is perhaps more problematic than the respectful use of an existing exonym. Finally, an endonym may be a plural noun and may not naturally extend itself to adjectival usage in another language like English, which has the propensity to use the adjectives for describing culture and language. The attempt to use the endonym thus has a bizarre-sounding result.

Official preferences 

Sometimes the government of a country tries to endorse the use of an endonym instead of traditional exonyms outside the country:

 In 1782, King Yotfa Chulalok of Siam moved the government seat from Thon Buri Province to Phra Nakhon Province. In 1972 the Thai government merged Thon Buri and Phra Nakhon, forming the new capital, Krungthep Mahanakhon. However, outside of Thailand, the capital retained the old name and is still called Bangkok.
 In 1935, Reza Shah requested that foreign nations use the name Iran rather than Persia in official correspondence. The name of the country had internally been Iran since the time of the Sassanid Empire (224–651), whereas the name Persia is descended from Greek , referring to a single province which is officially known as Fars Province.
 In 1949, the government of Siam changed the name to Thailand, although the former name's adjective in English (Siamese) was retained as the name for the fish, cat and conjoined twins.
 In 1972, the government of Ceylon (the word is the anglicized form of Portuguese ) changed the name to Sri Lanka, although the name Ceylon was retained as the name for that type of tea.
 In 1985, the government of Côte d'Ivoire requested that the country's French name be used in all languages instead of exonyms such as Ivory Coast, so that Côte d'Ivoire is now the official English name of that country in the United Nations and the International Olympic Committee (see name of Côte d'Ivoire). In most non-Francophone countries, however, the French version has not entered common parlance.
 In 1989, the government of Burma requested that the English name of the country be Myanmar, with Myanma as the adjective of the country and Bamar as the name of the inhabitants (see names of Burma).
 The Government of India officially changed the English name of Bombay to Mumbai in November 1995, following a trend of renaming of cities and states in India that has occurred since independence.
 The Ukrainian government maintains that the capital of Ukraine should be spelled Kyiv in English because the traditional English exonym Kiev was derived from the Russian name  (see Name of Kyiv).
 The Belarusian government argues that the endonym Belarus should be used in all languages. The result has been rather successful in English, where the former exonym Byelorussia/Belorussia, still used with reference to the Soviet Republic, has virtually died out; in other languages, exonyms are still much more common than Belarus, for instance in Danish , Dutch , Estonian , Faroese , Finnish , German , Greek , Hungarian , Icelandic , Swedish , Turkish , Chinese , Arabic  (all literally 'White Russia'), or French , Italian , Portuguese , Spanish , and Serbian .
Most countries have adopted this change, except for Lithuania, which adopted  (a Lithuanianised version of the country's endonym). As a response, Georgia changed the name of Lithuania in Georgian from the Russian-derived  to the endonym .
This use has now been made official within China.
 In December 2021, a circular was issued by President Recep Tayyip Erdoğan of Turkey ordering the use of Türkiye (also rendered Turkiye in English) instead of exonyms in official communications, no matter the language.

Hanyu Pinyin 

Following the 1979 declaration of Hanyu Pinyin spelling as the standard romanisation of Chinese, many Chinese endonyms have successfully replaced English exonyms, especially city and most provincial names in mainland China, for example: Beijing, Qingdao, and the Province of Guangdong. However, older English exonyms are sometimes used in certain contexts, for example: Peking (Beijing; duck, opera, etc.), Tsingtao (Qingdao), and Canton (Guangdong). In some cases the traditional English exonym is based on a local Chinese dialect instead of Mandarin, in the case of Xiamen, where the name Amoy is closer to the Hokkien pronunciation.

One exception of Pinyin standardization in mainland China is the spelling of the province Shaanxi, which is the Gwoyeu Romatzyh spelling of the province. That is because if Pinyin were used to spell the province, it would be indistinguishable from its neighboring province Shanxi, where the pronunciations of the two provinces only differ by tones, which are usually not written down when used in English.

In Taiwan, however, the standardization of Hanyu Pinyin has only seen mixed results. In Taipei, most (but not all) street and district names shifted to Hanyu Pinyin. For example, the Sinyi District is now spelled Xinyi. However, districts like Tamsui and even Taipei itself are not spelled according to Hanyu Pinyin spelling rules. As a matter of fact, most names of Taiwanese cities are still spelled using Chinese postal romanization, including Taipei, Taichung, Taitung, Keelung, and Kaohsiung. 

During the 1980's, the Singapore Government encouraged the use of Hanyu Pinyin spelling for place names, especially those with Teochew, Hokkien or Cantonese names, as part of the Speak Mandarin Campaign to promote Mandarin and discourage the use of dialects. For example, the area of Nee Soon, named after Teochew-Peranakan businessman Lim Nee Soon (Hanyu Pinyin: Lín Yìshùn) became Yishun and the neighbourhood schools and places established following the change used the Hanyu Pinyin spelling. In contrast, Hougang is the Hanyu Pinyin spelling but the Hokkien pronunciation au-kang is most commonly used. The changes to Hanyu Pinyin were not only financially costly but were unpopular with the locals, who opined that the Hanyu Pinyin versions were too difficult for non-Chinese or non-Mandarin speakers to pronounce. The government eventually stopped the changes by the 1990's, which has led to some place names within a locality having differing spellings. For example, Nee Soon Road and the Singapore Armed Forces base Nee Soon Camp are both located in Yishun but retained the old spelling.

Exonyms as pejoratives 

Matisoff wrote, "A group's autonym is often egocentric, equating the name of the people with 'mankind in general,' or the name of the language with 'human speech'."

In Basque, the term  is used for speakers of any language different from Basque (usually Spanish or French).

Many millennia earlier, the Greeks thought that all non-Greeks were uncultured and so called them "barbarians", which eventually gave rise to the exonym "Berber".

Slavic people 
Exonyms often describe others as "foreign-speaking", "non-speaking", or "nonsense-speaking". The term survives to this day in the Slavic languages (e.g. Russian), and was borrowed into Hungarian, Romanian, and Ottoman Turkish (in which case it referred specifically to Austria).

One of the more prominent theories regarding the origin of the term "Slav" suggests that it comes from the Slavic root  (hence "Slovakia" and "Slovenia" for example), meaning 'word' or 'speech'. In this context, the Slavs are describing Germanic people as "mutes"—in contrast to themselves, "the speaking ones".

Native Americans 
The most common names of several Indigenous American tribes derive from pejorative exonyms. The name "Apache" most likely derives from a Zuni word meaning "enemy". The name "Comanche" comes from the Ute word  meaning "enemy, stranger". The Ancestral Puebloans are also known as the "Anasazi", a Navajo word meaning "ancient enemies", and contemporary Puebloans discourage the use of the exonym.

Various Native-American autonyms are sometimes explained to English readers as having literal translations of "original people" or "normal people", with implicit contrast to other first nations as not original or not normal.

Confusion with renaming

In Eurasia 
Exonyms and endonyms must not be confused with the results of geographical renaming as in the case of Saint Petersburg, which became Petrograd in 1914, Leningrad in 1924, and again Saint Petersburg in 1991. In this case, although Saint Petersburg has a German etymology, it was never a German exonym for the city between 1914 and 1991, just as Nieuw Amsterdam, the Dutch name of New York City until 1664, is not its Dutch exonym.

Old place names that have become outdated after renaming may afterward still be used as historicisms. For example, even today one would talk about the Siege of Leningrad, not the Siege of St. Petersburg because at that time (1941–1944) the city was called Leningrad. Likewise, one would say that Immanuel Kant was born in Königsberg in 1724, not in Kaliningrad, as it has been called since 1946.

Likewise, Istanbul is still called  in Greek, although the name was changed in Turkish to dissociate the city from its Greek past between 1923 and 1930 (the name Istanbul itself derives from a Medieval Greek phrase).

In East Asia 
Although the pronunciation for several names of Chinese cities such as Beijing and Nanjing has not changed for quite some time while in Mandarin Chinese (although the prestige dialect shifted from Nanjing dialect to Beijing dialect during the 19th century), they were called Peking and Nanking in English due to the older Chinese postal romanization convention, based largely on the Nanjing dialect, which was used for transcribing Chinese place names before Pinyin, based largely on the Beijing dialect became the official romanization method for Mandarin in the 1970s. Since the Mandarin pronunciation does not perfectly map to an English phoneme, English speakers using either romanization will not pronounce the names correctly if standard English pronunciation is used. Nonetheless, many older English speakers still refer to the cities by their older English names, and even today they are often used in their traditional associations, such as Peking duck, Peking opera, and Peking University. As for Saint Petersburg, the historical event called the Nanking Massacre (1937) uses the city's older name because that was the name of the city at the time of occurrence.

Likewise, many Korean cities like Busan and Incheon (formerly Pusan and Inchǒn respectively) also underwent changes in spelling due to changes in romanization, even though the Korean pronunciations have largely stayed the same.

In India 
The name Madras, now Chennai, may be a special case. When the city was first settled by English people, in the early 17th century, both names were in use. They possibly referred to different villages which were fused into the new settlement. In any case, Madras became the exonym, while more recently, Chennai became the endonym. Madrasi, a term for a native of the city, has often been used derogatorily to refer to the people of Dravidian origin from the southern states of India.

Lists of exonyms 
 Latin exonyms
 List of English exonyms
 English exonyms for German toponyms
 English-translated personal names
List of French exonyms
 French exonyms for Dutch toponyms
 French exonyms for German toponyms
 French exonyms for Italian toponyms
List of German exonyms
 German names for Central European towns
 German exonyms for places in Belgium
 German exonyms for places in Croatia
 German exonyms for places in Denmark
 German exonyms for places in Estonia
 German exonyms for places in Hungary
 German exonyms for places in Latvia
 German exonyms for places in Slovakia
 German exonyms for places in Switzerland
 List of European exonyms
 Names of European cities in different languages
 Finnish exonyms
 Greek exonyms
 Italian exonyms
 Portuguese exonyms
 Icelandic exonyms
 Romanian exonyms
 Russian exonyms
 Slavic toponyms for Greek places
 Swedish exonyms
 Welsh names for other places in Britain and Ireland
 African/Asian/Middle-Eastern/Eurasian exonyms
 Afrikaans exonyms
 Arabic exonyms
 Azerbaijani exonyms
 Armenian exonyms
 Chinese exonyms
 Japanese exonyms
 Turkish exonyms
 Vietnamese exonyms

See also 
 -onym
 Emic and etic
 Shibboleth

Other lists 
 List of countries and dependencies and their capitals in native languages
 List of adjectival and demonymic forms of place names
 List of language names
 List of alternative country names
 List of country names in various languages
 List of Latin place names in Europe
 List of European regions with alternative names
 List of European rivers with alternative names
 List of traditional Greek place names
 List of Coptic placenames
 Place names in Irish
 Names of places in Finland in Finnish and in Swedish
 List of renamed Indian cities and states

References

Citations

General and cited sources 

 Jordan, Peter, Hubert Bergmann, Caroline Burgess, and Catherine Cheetham, eds. 2010 & 2011. "Trends in Exonym Use." Proceedings of the 10th UNGEGN Working Group on Exonyms Meeting. Tainach (28–30 April 2010). Hamburg (2011). Name & Place 1.
 Jordan, Peter, Milan Orožen Adamič, and Paul Woodman, eds. 2007. "Exonyms and the International Standardisation of Geographical Names." Approaches towards the Resolution of an Apparent Contradiction. Wien and Berlin. Wiener Osteuropastudien 24.

External links 

 2006 UN document discussing exonyms (PDF)
 Jacek Wesołowski's Place Names in Europe, featuring endonyms and exonyms for many cities
 "Does Juliet's Rose, by Any Other Name, Smell as Sweet?" by Verónica Albin.
 Looking up in exonym database
 European geographical names infrastructure and services (EuroGeoNames)
 UN document describing EuroGeoNames (PDF)
 World map of country endonyms

 
 
Ethnicity
Ethnonyms
Etymology
Geopolitical terminology
Human names
Language naming
Onomastics
Place names
Semantics
Toponymy